Jonathan Rowson (born 18 April 1977) is a Scottish chess player and philosopher. He is a three-time Scottish chess champion and was awarded the title of Grandmaster by FIDE in 1999. As Director of the Social Brain Centre at the United Kingdom's Royal Society for the encouragement of Arts, Manufactures and Commerce (RSA), he authored numerous research reports on behavior change, climate change, and spirituality.

Career

He made his Scotland debut for the national Primary School team in the match against England in 1988. At this time he attended Skene Square Primary School, though he later attended Aberdeen Grammar School where a Maths teacher, Michael Wilson, organised and encouraged the school team. Although in 1988 he was not the best player in his age-group at the time, his progress was rapid and he began competing on the world stage in 1991, winning a silver medal in the European Under 18 Championship in 1995 (behind Robert Kempiński of Poland).

After taking a year out to study chess in the wake of this success, he went to Keble College, University of Oxford where he earned a first class degree in Philosophy, Politics and Economics. Rowson has an interest in Eastern thought and, following a year at Harvard, completed a PhD thesis on Wisdom at Bristol University, supervised by Guy Claxton.

He came second in the European Under 20 Championship in 1997 and achieved his third and final norm required for the title of Grandmaster (and with it the title) in the 1999 Scottish Chess Championship. He went on to win the event again in 2001 and 2004, completing a rare double when he went on to become the 2004 British Champion. He successfully defended his British title in 2005 and again in 2006.  He also won the 2000 Canadian Open Chess Championship and tied for first with Vasilios Kotronias in the Hastings International Chess Congress in 2003/04.

Rowson is Director of the Social Brain Centre at the RSA. 
After degrees spanning a range of social science disciplines from Oxford and Harvard, Jonathan's Doctoral research at the University of Bristol featured an analysis of the challenge of overcoming the psycho-social constraints that prevent people becoming 'wiser'. He writes for The Guardian's Behavioural Insights Blog, was formerly a columnist for the Herald newspaper, has authored three books.

In 2016, he founded the research institute Perspectiva in London together with Tomas Björkman. The aim of the institute is to inspire our political, academic and business leaders to examine real world problems with a deeper appreciation of the influence of our inner worlds.

Chess strength
Rowson's peak rating of 2599 was achieved in July 2005, when he was ranked number 139 in the world. In addition to winning the British Championship in three consecutive years, Rowson's best results include sharing first at the World Open in Philadelphia in 2002, at the Hastings Premier in 2003/4, and outright first at the Capo D'Orso open in Sardinia in 2008.

Books
Rowson has written numerous magazine articles and four books on the game:
 Understanding the Grunfeld (1998). Gambit Publications. ;
 The Seven Deadly Chess Sins (2000). Gambit Publications. ;
 Chess for Zebras (2005). Gambit Publications. ;
 The Moves That Matter: A Chess Grandmaster on the Game of Life (2019). Bloomsbury Publishing 

The historian and critic Edward Winter has observed that "Jonathan Rowson is one of the best and cleverest chess writers."

Notable games
Jonathan Rowson vs Kaido Kulaots, DEN-chJ 1996, Sicilian Defense: Najdorf, Amsterdam Variation (B93), 1-0
Jonathan Rowson vs Neil R McDonald, London Agency 1998, Slav Defense: Exchange Variation (D13), ½–½
Jonathan Rowson vs Bogdan Lalic, BCF-chT 9899 (4NCL) 1998, Caro-Kann Defense: Classical Variation (B18), ½–½
Jonathan Rowson vs Nick DeFirmian, 2nd Milk Tournament 2003, Sicilian Defense: Najdorf Variation, English Attack Anti-English (B90), 1-0

References

External links
Jonathan Rowson games at 365Chess.com

Jonathan Rowson at Chessmetrics
Interview with GM Jonathan Rowson

1977 births
Living people
Harvard University alumni
Chess grandmasters
Chess Olympiad competitors
Scottish chess players
British chess writers
Alumni of Keble College, Oxford
Scottish non-fiction writers
Sportspeople from Aberdeen
People educated at Aberdeen Grammar School